Beatin' the Odds is the third studio album by American rock band Molly Hatchet, released in 1980. This is the first album with new vocalist Jimmy Farrar, who replaced Danny Joe Brown. A remastered edition of the album was issued in 2008 by Rock Candy Records, with four live bonus tracks and extensive liner notes. The remastering was directed by British producer Jon Astley. The album was also reissued under the SPV/Steamhammer label in 2013 and only included the original tracks.

The cover art for the album was "Conan the Conqueror" by Frank Frazetta.

Track listing
Side one
"Beatin' the Odds" (Dave Hlubek, Duane Roland, Banner Thomas)  – 3:18
"Double Talker" (Hlubek, Roland) – 3:15
"The Rambler" (Jimmy Farrar, Hlubek) – 4:50
"Sailor" (Thomas) – 3:50

Side two
"Dead and Gone" (Farrar, Thomas) – 4:22
"Few and Far Between" (Bruce Crump, Steve Holland) – 3:40
"Penthouse Pauper" (John Fogerty) – 3:18 (Creedence Clearwater Revival cover)
"Get Her Back" (Roland) – 3:03
"Poison Pen" (Hlubek, Holland) – 3:06

2008 re-issue live bonus tracks
Recorded live at The Lakeland Civic Centre, Lakeland, Florida, on 31 December 1980
"Beatin' the Odds" - 3:38
"Few and Far Between" - 3:41
"Penthouse Pauper" - 4:07
"Dead and Gone" - 4:34

Personnel
Molly Hatchet
Jimmy Farrar - vocals
Dave Hlubek - guitar, slide guitar
Steve Holland - guitar
Duane Roland - guitar, slide guitar
Banner Thomas - bass
Bruce Crump - drums

Additional musicians
Jai Winding - keyboard

Production
Tom Werman -  producer 
Gary Ladinsky - engineer, mixing
Bill Vermillion, Gary Pritikin - assistant engineers
George Marino - mastering at Sterling Sound, New York
Pat Armstrong - executive producer, director
Frank Frazetta - cover painting

Charts

Album

Singles

Certifications

References

Molly Hatchet albums
1980 albums
Albums produced by Tom Werman
Epic Records albums
Albums with cover art by Frank Frazetta